is a Japanese musician who worked with artists like Susumu Hirasawa (P-Model), and Jun Togawa.

In the early 1980s, Kotobuki joined Morio Agata's tour as a keyboard player and guitarist. After Agata's tour, Kotobuki and Agata formed a band which they called the Yukiyama Brothers. During his time with the Yukiyama Brothers, he played the keyboard on Shigeru Izumiya's tour. Kotobuki joined the band P-Model in 1987, which was formed by Susumu Hirasawa. In his time with P-Model, he played the keyboard as well. Hikaru Kotobuki played many concerts and released music videos with P-Model. The band took a four-year break, but came back together in 1991. Kotobuki resigned in 1993 in order to travel through Asia, which he eventually did for several years, but he stuck around in Tokyo long enough to form Phnonpenh MODEL, originally a parody band that continues to this day. He also performs as a solo act with a backing band.

External links
Hikaru Kotobuki's site

1964 births
Japanese keyboardists
Living people
Musicians from Hokkaido